An ulu (plural: uluit, 'woman's knife') is an all-purpose knife traditionally used by Inuit, Iñupiat, Yupik, and Aleut women. It is utilized in applications as diverse as skinning and cleaning animals, cutting a child's hair, cutting food and, if necessary, trimming blocks of snow and ice used to build an igloo.

Name

The following chart lists both Eskimo-Aleut terms as well as two terms for the same tool in Athabaskan languages, which are an unrelated language family spoken by non-Inuit-Iñupiat-Aleut Alaska Natives.

Materials
Traditionally the ulu was made with a caribou antler, muskox horn or walrus ivory handle and slate cutting surface, due to the lack of metal smelting technology in the Arctic. The handle could also be carved from bone, and wood was sometimes used when it was available. In certain areas, such as Ulukhaktok Northwest Territories, copper was used for the cutting surface.

The modern ulu is still often made with a caribou antler handle but the blade is usually made of steel. The steel is often obtained by purchasing a hand saw or wood saw and cutting the blade to the correct shape. A hardwood called  is also used for handles. Uluit are often home made, but there is also an industry of commercially produced uluit, sometimes made with a plastic handle and complete with a cutting board.

Usage and styles

The size of the ulu typically reflects its usage. An ulu with a  blade would be used as part of a sewing kit to cut sinew or for cutting out patterns from animal skins. An ulu with a  blade would be used for general purposes.

The ulu comes in four distinct styles, the Iñupiat (or Alaskan), Canadian, West Greenlandic and East Greenlandic. With the Inupiat style ulu the blade has a centre piece cut out and both ends of the blade fit into the handle. In Canada the blade more often is attached to the handle by a single stem in the centre. In the western areas of the Canadian Arctic the blade of the ulu tends to be of a triangular shape, while in the eastern Arctic the ends of the blade tend to be more pointed.

The shape of the ulu ensures that the force is centered more over the middle of the blade than with an ordinary knife. This makes the ulu easier to use when cutting hard objects such as bone. Because the rocking motion used when cutting on a plate or board with an ulu pins down the food being cut, it is also easier to use an ulu one-handed (a typical steak knife, in contrast, requires a fork).

Ulu knives are sometimes used for purposes other than their original intent. Because of their cultural symbolism throughout the Arctic, they are sometimes presented to people who have accomplished significant things, such as sports or education. Specifically, the Arctic Winter Games presents gold, silver, and bronze uluit to successful athletes, acting in place of a medal.

History
Uluit have been found that date back to as early as 2500 BCE. Traditionally, the ulu would be passed down from generation to generation. It was believed that an ancestor's knowledge was contained within the ulu and thus would also be passed on.

Legality
Some countries, including Canada, prohibit the possession or carrying of knives where the blade is perpendicular to the handle (intended to limit the use of so-called "push daggers"). However, regulations passed under the Criminal Code specifically exempt the "aboriginal 'ulu' knife" from this prohibition.

Uluit are not allowed as carry-on on commercial airline flights in the US, though they can be in checked bags.

Gallery

See also
Mezzaluna
Tumi
Scraper

References

External links

 Collection of uluit in the National Museum of the American Indian
Images and descriptions of uluit and other Inuit tools and clothing at McCord Museum
Video showing the use of an ulu
Various items about uluit at Civilization.ca

Knives
Inuit tools
Inuit weapons